Gastrodia africana is a species of plant in the family Orchidaceae. It is endemic to Cameroon. Its natural habitat is subtropical or tropical dry forests. It is threatened by habitat loss.

References

africana
Endemic orchids of Cameroon
Taxonomy articles created by Polbot

Endangered flora of Africa